Carmela Allucci (born 22 January 1970 in Naples) is a female water polo midfielder from Italy, who won the gold medal with the Women's National Team at the 2004 Summer Olympics in Athens, Greece.

Allucci was given the honour to carry the national flag of Italy at the closing ceremony of the 2004 Summer Olympics, becoming the first female water polo player to be a flag bearer at the opening and closing ceremonies of the Olympics.

See also
 Italy women's Olympic water polo team records and statistics
 List of Olympic champions in women's water polo
 List of Olympic medalists in water polo (women)
 List of world champions in women's water polo
 List of World Aquatics Championships medalists in water polo

References

External links
 
 

1970 births
Living people
Water polo players from Naples
Italian female water polo players
Water polo drivers
Water polo players at the 2004 Summer Olympics
Medalists at the 2004 Summer Olympics
Olympic gold medalists for Italy in water polo
World Aquatics Championships medalists in water polo
21st-century Italian women